Iron Mountain is a prominent mountain summit in the southern Sangre de Cristo Range of the Rocky Mountains of North America.

Mountain

See also

List of Colorado mountain ranges
List of Colorado mountain summits
List of Colorado fourteeners
List of Colorado 4000 meter prominent summits
List of the most prominent summits of Colorado
List of Colorado county high points

References

External links

Mountains of Colorado
Mountains of Costilla County, Colorado
Mountains of Huerfano County, Colorado
Sangre de Cristo Mountains
North American 3000 m summits